Sellye is a district in south-western part of Baranya County, Hungary. Sellye is also the name of the town where the district seat is found. The district is located in the Southern Transdanubia Statistical Region.

Geography 
Sellye District borders with Szigetvár District and Szentlőrinc District to the north, Pécs District and Siklós District to the east, the Croatian counties of Virovitica-Podravina and Osijek-Baranja to the south, Barcs District (Somogy County) to the west. The number of the inhabited places in Sellye District is 38.

Municipalities 
The district has 1 town, 1 large village and 36 villages.
(ordered by population, as of 1 January 2012)

The bolded municipality is city, italics municipality is large village.

See also
List of cities and towns in Hungary

References

External links
 Postal codes of the Sellye District

Districts in Baranya County